Tagliatelle (from the Italian tagliare, meaning "to cut") are a traditional type of pasta from the Emilia-Romagna and Marche regions of Italy. Tagliatelle can be served with a variety of sauces, though the classic is a meat sauce or Bolognese sauce.

Tagliatelle are traditionally made with egg pasta. The traditional ratio is one egg to one hundred grams of flour.

Origins
Legend has it that tagliatelle was created by a talented court chef, who was inspired by Lucrezia d'Este's hairdo on the occasion of her marriage to Annibale II Bentivoglio, in 1487. In reality, this was a joke invented by humorist Augusto Majani in 1931.

The recipe was called tagliolini di pasta e sugo, alla maniera di Zafiran (tagliolini of pasta and sauce in the manner of Zafiran) and it was served on silver plates. Over the years, tagliatelle has become considered a more common food.

A glass case in the Bologna Chamber of Commerce holds a solid gold replica of a piece of tagliatella, demonstrating the correct width of  when cooked, equivalent to  uncooked, depending on the hardness of the dough.

Dishes
The texture is porous and rough, making it ideal for thick sauces, generally made with beef, veal, or pork (such as bolognese sauce), and occasionally with rabbit, as well as several other less rich (and more vegetarian) options, such as briciole e noci (with breadcrumbs and nuts), uovo e formaggio (with eggs and cheese), or simply pomodoro e basilico (with tomatoes and basil).

See also
 Tagliolini
 Bavette
 Passatelli
 Pappardelle
 Fettuccine

References

Cuisine of Emilia-Romagna
Wide pasta